Katrina Ann Hodgkinson (born 10 March 1966) is a former Federal Vice President of the National Party of Australia and a former Australian Member of Parliament. She was a member of the New South Wales Legislative Assembly, representing Cootamundra for The Nationals from 28 March 2015 to 1 September 2017, and Burrinjuck from 27 March 1999 to 27 March 2015.

Early years and background
Hodgkinson was educated at Canberra Girls' Grammar School and Narrabundah College, and Metropolitan Business College of New South Wales.  She was an executive officer in the Commonwealth Department of Transport and for Sydney property development companies, becoming Secretary of the Year for the North Sydney region in 1989.  She was a Technical and Further Education instructor from 1989 to 1991, owned regional small businesses from 1989 to 1997 and she was Adviser to Senator the Hon Nick Minchin, Special Minister of State and Minister for Industry, Science and Resources from 1997 to 1999.

Parliamentary career

In 1995, Hodgkinson sought election to the seat of Southern Highlands in a three-cornered-contest. Despite receiving the highest primary vote, The Nationals were defeated on preferences. In 1998 Alby Schultz, then Member for Burrinjuck, resigned from NSW Parliament to contest the seat of Hume. Hodgkinson was elected to NSW Parliament at the subsequent 1999 election.

Between 2003 and 2011 Hodgkinson held a range of shadow ministerial responsibilities including Fair Trading and Small Business, Tourism, Major Events, Community Services, Families and Child Safety, Rural Affairs, and Natural Resource Management. In 2007, a substantial redistribution of electorate boundaries saw her constituency base move from Goulburn, Yass and Tumut to Cowra, Cootamundra, Yass and Young.

Following the 2011 state election, Hodgkinson was appointed on 3 April 2011 as NSW's first female Minister for Primary Industries and also as Minister for Small Business.

In 2013 a further statewide electoral redistribution was announced by the NSW Electoral Commission that resulted in a substantial revision of Hodgkinson's seat of Burrinjuck, including the loss of her home town of Yass, and the seat renamed Cootamundra, with effect from the 2015 NSW State election. At the same time, the neighbouring seat of electoral district of Goulburn, held by Minister for Community Services Pru Goward, was pushed westward to take in portions of Hodgkinson's former territory, including Hodgkinson's hometown of Yass and her current home in Berrima.

Hodgkinson initially announced plans to seek Nationals preselection in Goulburn, claiming that the redrawn Cootamundra was too far away from her base. This briefly touched off a dispute between the Liberals and Nationals, as it would have breached a longstanding Coalition agreement not to run three-cornered contests. Ultimately, Hodgkinson dropped plans to challenge Goward and contested Cootamundra, which she won easily.

Due to the resignation of Barry O'Farrell as Premier and Deputy Premier Andrew Stoner in 2014 and the subsequent ministerial reshuffle by new Premier Mike Baird and new Deputy Premier and Minister for Racing Troy Grant, in addition to her existing responsibilities as Minister for Primary Industries, Hodgkinson was appointed Assistant Minister for Tourism and Major Events Hodgkinson was appointed NSW's first Parliamentary Secretary for Southern NSW in the second Baird ministry following the 2015 state election.

Following the introduction by the Baird-Grant Government in October 2016 of legislation to ban greyhound racing in NSW, Hodgkinson, with fellow Nationals MPs for the seats of Barwon and Clarence, crossed the floor to vote against the ban. After months of intense public pressure from regional communities, Premier Baird introduced new legislation overturning the greyhound racing ban that he and Grant had introduced, and then retired from State Parliament.

Hodgkinson graduated from the Australian Institute of Company Directors in 2015, and as a Master of Business Administration through the Australian Institute of Business in 2017.  On 31 July 2017, she announced her intention to retire from the NSW Parliament effective 1 September 2017, resulting in a by-election for the seat of Cootamundra.

Hodgkinson was elected Federal Vice President of the National Party of Australia in August 2018.

At the 2019 federal election, she made an unsuccessful tilt at federal politics as the National Party candidate for the seat of Gilmore.

References

|-

1966 births
Living people
Members of the New South Wales Legislative Assembly
National Party of Australia members of the Parliament of New South Wales
People from Yass
21st-century Australian politicians
Women members of the New South Wales Legislative Assembly
Fellows of the Australian Institute of Company Directors
Australian Institute of Business alumni
21st-century Australian women politicians